Superhit Muqabla is a countdown show of songs that was broadcast on the Indian TV channel DD Metro. Kruttika Desai did most of the shows including covering Michael Jackson's History tour in Bangkok  Simultaneously the program was also shot in the Tamil language and was aired from DD Chennai at the same time.  Several failed attempts were made to revive the show.

References 

DD Metro original programming
DD National original programming
1993 Indian television series debuts
1994 Indian television series endings